The Dom Pedro aquamarine is the world's largest cut aquamarine gem. The stone was mined in Pedra Azul, in the state of Minas Gerais in Brazil around 1980, and named after the Brazilian emperors Pedro I and Pedro II. The blue-green gemstone was cut by Bernd Munsteiner into an obelisk form weighing 10,363 carats. The jewel was donated to the Smithsonian Institution by Jane Mitchell and Jeffery Bland. It is housed in the National Museum of Natural History's Janet Annenberg Hooker Hall of Geology.

See also
 List of individual gemstones

References

Jewellery in the collection of the Smithsonian Institution
Individual gemstones